
Year 244 BC was a year of the pre-Julian Roman calendar. At the time it was known as the Year of the Consulship of Atticus and Blaesus (or, less frequently, year 510 Ab urbe condita). The denomination 244 BC for this year has been used since the early medieval period, when the Anno Domini calendar era became the prevalent method in Europe for naming years.

Events 
 By place 
 Greece 
 Agis IV succeeds his father, Eudamidas II, as King of Sparta.
 The war in Asia Minor and the Aegean Sea intensifies as the Achaean League allies itself to Ptolemy III Euergetes of Egypt, while Seleucus II secures two allies in the Black Sea region. Ptolemy III's armies reach as far as Bactria and the borders of India in their attacks on the Seleucid Empire.
 By defeating the Egyptian fleet at Andros, Antigonus II is able to maintain his control over the Aegean Sea.

 Carthage 
 Hamilcar Barca transfers his army to the slopes of Mount Eryx (Monte San Giuliano), from which he is able to lend support to the besieged garrison in the neighbouring town of Drepanum (Trapani).

 China 
 The Qin general Meng Ao annexes 13 cities from the State of Han.
 The Qin envoy Gan Luo persuades King Daoxiang of Zhao to cede five cities.
 The State of Zhao annexes dozens of cities from the State of Yan.

Births

Deaths 
 Eudamidas II, king of Sparta

References